The Board of Lady Managers of the World's Columbian Exposition was organized November 19, 1890. It oversaw the construction of The Woman's Building in Chicago and organized the exposition's World's Congress of Representative Women (1893). A cookbook with autographed recipes of board members was also issued.

The Board of Lady Managers was created by the U.S. Congress to see that women were placed upon the Juries of Award, which were to pass upon work done wholly or in part by women, and to perform such other duties as might be assigned by the Exposition's National Commission. It was subsequently given by the Commission full management and control of the building known as the Woman's Building, together with the general charge and management of the interests of women in all of the Exposition buildings. It was made the official channel of communication through which all women or organizations of women were to be brought into relation with the Exposition, and through which applications for space for women or their exhibits should be received. The members of the Board succeeded in securing for women the fullest possible representation in the department buildings, and modified their original plans in order to increase the amount of space to be put at their disposal in the Woman's Building.

Origins
Beginning in 1889, activist women in Chicago lobbied to make their city the site of the world's fair of 1892. They also petitioned for an official place for women in the planning and exhibitions at the fair. Led by Emma Gilson Wallace, they suggested forming a "Women's Department for the Fair". These activists came from various women's organizations involved in philanthropy, education, and suffrage.

The Quatro-Centennial Committee of the Senate (i.e. commemorating the 400th anniversary of Columbus's first voyage to the New World) approved the Fair Bill naming Chicago as the site. When the bill was sent to the House of Representatives, William McKendree Springer attached an amendment to create a Board of Lady Managers. The House accepted the bill and in 1890 President Benjamin Harrison signed the bill into law.

The Board appointments, made by the National Commission, numbered 117, including two Lady Managers from each state, territory and the District of Columbia, as well as members-at-large. Among their duties related to the Fair, the Lady Managers were in charge of the plans for the Women's Hall.

Administration

There were five convenings of the Board:
 First Session, November 19–26, 1890 
 Second Session, September 2–9, 1891
 Third Session, October 1892
 Fourth Session, April 1893
 Fifth Session, July 1893

The by-laws of the Board of Lady Managers, as amended, included provisions for an official title, quorum, powers of alternate managers, officers of the board, an Executive Committee, duties of the board president, duties of the board vice-presidents, duties of the board secretary, vice-chair of the Executive Committee, and amendments.

The Woman's Building

Bertha Honoré Palmer served as the president of the 117-woman strong Board of Lady Managers, the organization which dealt with women's business at the World's Columbian Exposition. The Board constructed The Woman's Building, designed by 21-year-old Sophia Hayden, as the showplace for women's art. The building itself was decorated by women artists, featuring architectural ornament sculpted by Enid Yandell and Alice Rideout, both 19, and a large painting by Mary Cassatt, Modern Woman, one of two extensive murals in the Woman's Building, the other one, Primitive Woman being by Mary MacMonnies. Interior art was curated by Candace Wheeler and Sara Hallowell. The Board also built a Children's Building, a child-care center required to support fair-goers and convention-goers who brought children. As well, the Board built a women's dormitory near the fairgrounds, to house women traveling alone or with small children.

Legacy
Carrie V. Shuman compiled a cookbook, Favorite Dishes: A Columbian Autograph Souvenir Cookery Book. Over three hundred autograph recipes, and twenty-three portraits, contributed specially by the Board of Lady Managers of the World's Columbia Exposition (Chicago, 1893) with illustrations by May Root-Kern, Mellie Ingels Julian, Louis Braunhold, and George Wharton Edwards.

After the exposition, the Woman's Building was torn down, and the mural by Mary Cassatt was misplaced and lost. Bertha Palmer was appointed United States Commissioner at the Paris Exposition of 1900 by President William McKinley, the only woman so distinguished by any government.

Notable people

Officers

Prominent officials:
Mrs. Bertha Palmer – President
Mrs. Susan G. Cook – Secretary
 Phoebe Couzins, Secretary
Mrs. V.C. Meredith – Vice Chairman Executive Committee
Mrs. Russell B. Harrington – Vice-President at Large
Mrs. John A. Logan – Vice-Chairman Committee on Ceremonies

Vice-Presidents:
Mrs. Ralph Trautman – First Vice-President
Mrs. Edwin C. Burleigh – Second Vice-President
Mrs. Charles Price – Third Vice-President
Miss K.L. Minor – Fourth Vice-President
Mrs. Beriah Wilkins – Fifth Vice-President
Mrs. Susan R. Ashley – Sixth Vice-President
Mrs. Flora Beall Ginty – Seventh Vice-President
Mrs. Margaret Blaine Salisbury – Eighth Vice-President

Committee on Congresses

 Susan R. Ashley
 Frances Elizabeth Newbury Bagley, Vice-Chair
 Helen Morton Barker 
 Laurette Lovell
 Mary Kavanaugh Eagle , Chair
 Eliza M. Russell
 Julia Ball Reed Shattuck
 Lillian M. N. Stevens

Members

 Mary A. Cochran, Texas
 Ellen M. Chandler, Vermont
 Mrs. John Sergeant Wise, Virginia
 Mrs. K. S. G. Paul, Virginia
 Melissa D. Owings, Washington
 Alice Houghton, Washington
 Mrs. W. Newton Linch, West Virginia
 Lily Irene Jackson, West Virginia
 Flora Beall Ginty, Wisconsin
 Mrs. William P. Lynde, Wisconsin
 Mrs. F. H. Harrison, Wyoming
 Frances E. Hale, Wyoming

Resident members

Helen Morton Barker
Mrs. Matilda B. Carse
Dr. Frances Dickenson
Mrs. James R. Doolittle, Jr.
Mrs. James A. Mulligan
Mrs. Potter Palmer
Mrs. Leander Stone
Mrs. L. Brace Shattuck
Mrs. Solomon Thacher, Jr.
Mrs. M.R.M. Wallace

References

Attribution
 Anthony, Susan B.; Harper, Ida Husted, editors. History of Woman Suffrage, Volume IV (1883–1900), published 1902, at Internet Archive

Bibliography
 Smith, Karen Manners, author; Cott, Nancy F., editor. New Paths to Power, 1890–1920. Chapter 7 of No Small Courage, Oxford University Press, 2000, pp. 353–357.

External links
 Appropriations for Board of Lady Managers World's Columbian Exposition: Letter from the Secretary of the Treasury, Transmitting, an Estimate of Appropriation, Submitted by the President of the World's Columbian Exposition, for Expenses of the Board of Lady Managers for the Fiscal Year Beginning July 1, 1893 (U.S. Government Printing Office, 1892)

World's Columbian Exposition
Women's organizations based in the United States
1890 establishments in the United States